In mathematics, a Barlow surface is one of the  complex surfaces introduced by . They are simply connected surfaces of general type with pg = 0. They are homeomorphic but not diffeomorphic to a projective plane blown up in 8 points.  The Hodge diamond for the Barlow surfaces is:

See also
 Hodge theory

References

Algebraic surfaces
Complex surfaces